HM Trawler Kastoria, pennant number 4.148, was a Royal Navy minesweeper during the Second World War.  She was originally a commercial trawler but was requisitioned by the Admiralty in 1941 as a naval trawler and returned to her original owners in 1946.

References

1916 ships
Naval trawlers of the United Kingdom